Jeffrey E. Young (born March 9, 1950) is an American psychologist best known for having developed schema therapy. He is the founder of the Schema Therapy Institute.

After earning an undergraduate degree at Yale University, he obtained a higher education degree at the University of Pennsylvania, where he then pursued postdoctoral studies with Aaron Beck.

He has written numerous books on cognitive behavioral therapy and schema therapy. His two most famous books are Schema Therapy (for professionals), and Reinventing Your Life (for the general public).

When interviewed in 2021, Jeffrey Young said a critical part of being effective in delivering Schema Therapy is to understand that culture affects schemas and modes.

References

Sources 

Living people
21st-century American psychologists
Yale University alumni
University of Pennsylvania alumni
1950 births
20th-century American psychologists